HIIT is high-intensity interval training.

HIIT may also refer to:

 Helsinki Institute for Information Technology, a computer science research institute in Helsinki, Finland
 Hamdard Institute of Information Technology, a computer science institute at Hamdard University in Karachi, Pakistan
 "HIIT", an episode of How Heavy Are the Dumbbells You Lift?
 HIIT Brands, and activeware company acquired by ASOS